Yolanda Oreamuno Unger (8 April 1916 – 8 July 1956) was a Costa Rican writer. Her most acclaimed novel is La Ruta de su Evasión (1948). Her 40 years of life were markedly divided into two phases: the first 20 years, filled with youth, beauty and happiness, contrasted sharply with the following years of tragedy, loneliness and sickness.

Early life
Yolanda Oreamuno was the only child of Carlos Oreamuno Pacheco and Margarita Unger Salazar. Her father died before her first birthday, so she was mainly raised by her maternal grandmother, Eudoxia Salazar Salazar, whose husband Unger was deceased by then. She obtained her secondary education in the Colegio Superior de Señoritas. She then studied bookkeeping and worked at the Costa Rican Post Office headquarters.

At the age of 20 she published her first two stories, "La lagartija de la panza blanca" and "Para Revenar, no para Max Jiménez".

Marriage and adult life
She was working in the Chilean embassy when she met the diplomat Jorge Molina Wood. They were married, and moved to that country. She recounted life during that time in her stories La mareas vuelven de noche and Don Junvencio (which remained unpublished until 1971). Her time in Chile was prolific; her stories appeared in Repertorio Americano, including 40º sobre cero, 18 de setiembre, Misa de ocho, Vela urbana, El espíritu de mi tierra,  Insomnio and El negro, sentido de la alegría. Their marriage, however, fell apart in 1936; her husband, weakened by an incurable disease, committed suicide. She returned to Costa Rica at the end of 1936.

In 1937 she married a lawyer, Óscar Barahona Streber, who was involved with the Costa Rican communist movement. They both participated in opposition activities.  Their son, Sergio Barahona Oreamuno, was born 21 September 1942. Their marriage did  not last; after their divorce, her ex-husband migrated to Guatemala.

She wrote her first novel, Por tierra firme, in 1938. In 1940 she submitted it to a writing contest, winning a three-way first prize. However, she declined to share the honor with the others, and decided against sending the manuscript for publication; eventually the manuscript was lost.

Oreamuno moved to Mexico, then decided to become a permanent Guatemalan citizen. However, by 1949 she was gravely ill, and she dwelt four months in a Washington D. C. hospital. She left the hospital to travel to Mexico City, to stay in the house of Costa Rican poet Eunice Odio. She died there in 1956. She was buried in a mausoleum in San Joaquín, D.F. In 1963 her remains were moved to San José. On the 55th anniversary of her death (8 July 2011), a commemorative plaque was installed over her tomb.

Literary work

Novels
 Por tierra firme (text lost)
 La ruta de su evasión, first-place winner of the concurso Centroamericano de Novela, hosted by the Guatemalan Ministerio de Educación Pública (1948)

Other works 
 A lo largo del corto camino, collection of essays, criticisms, and stories, with four chapters of La ruta de su evasión. Editorial Costa Rica, colección Biblioteca de Autores Costarricenses (1961)

Stories or articles published
 Vela urbana, Repertorio Americano, San José (March 1937)
 Misa de ocho, Repertorio Americano, San José (1937)
 40º sobre cero (in Panamá), Repertorio Americano (1937)
 La lagartija de la panza blanca (Un cuento para hombres-niños de imaginación grande), dedicated to the painter Teodorico Quirós 
 El espíritu de mi tierra, San José (August 1937)
 Apología del limón dulce y el paisaje, Repertorio Americano, Bogotá, Colombia (March 1944)
 México es mío, en Repertorio Americano, México (December 1944)
 El negro, sentido de la alegría
 Dos tormentas y una aurora (1944)
 Casta sombría (1944)
 Pasajeros al norte, en Repertorio Americano, México (September 1944)
 José de la Cruz recoge su muerte 
 Un regalo, Repertorio Americano, México (July 1948)
 Valle Alto, Brecha (December 1958)

Evaluation of her work
Her most renowned novel is La Ruta de su Evasión (1948). Oreamuno draws on narrative techniques that were uncommon in other Costa Rican writers. It is believed that authors like Thomas Mann and Marcel Proust influenced her literary creation. Costa Rican critic Abelardo Bonilla wrote that "In this as in all works of Yolanda Oreamuno there is boldness of conception and form, but there is a lack of internal unity".

References

External links
 Yolanda Oreamuno. La lagartija de la panza blanca, story
 Yolanda Oreamuno en la Editorial Costa Rica
 Works of Yolanda Oreamuno
 Yolanda Oreamuno in the blog Cosas de Jota
 Yolanda Oreamuno en Latindex UCR
 Karim Taylhardat. Siluetas americanas, 15. Nácar, todavía, about Yolanda Oreamuno, Centro Virtual Cervantes 
  Benedicto Víquez Guzmán. 'La fugitiva': visión femenina de una época, review of the Sergio Ramírez novel in El arte literario y su teoría (5 November 2011)
 Chase, Alfonso. Narrativa contemporánea de Costa Rica, Ministerio de Cultura, Juventud y Deportes, San José, 1975
 Cortés, Carlos. La gran novela perdida. Historia personal de la narrativa costarrisible, Ediciones Perro Azul, San José, 2007
 Cubillo Paniagua, Ruth. Mujeres e identidades: las escritoras del 'Repertorio Americano' (1919-1959), Editorial de la Universidad de Costa Rica, San José, 2001
 Garnier, Leonor. Antología femenina del ensayo. Ministerio de Cultura, Juventud y Deportes, San José, 1976
 Kargleder, Charles y Warren H, Mory. Bibliografía Selectiva de la Literatura Costarricense, Editorial Costa Rica, San José, 1978
 Quesada Soto, Álvaro. Breve historia de la literatura costarricense. Editorial Costa Rica, San José, 2008
 Rojas, Margarita y Ovares, Flora. 100 años de literatura costarricense. Ediciones Farben, San José, 1995
 Rojas, Margarita, Ovares, Flora y otros. La casa paterna. Escritura y nación en Costa Rica, Editorial de la Universidad de Costa Rica, San José, 1993
 Valdeperas, Jorge.  Para una nueva interpretación de la literatura costarricense. Editorial Costa Rica, San José, 1979

Costa Rican women writers
1916 births
1956 deaths
Costa Rican novelists
Writers from San José, Costa Rica
20th-century novelists
20th-century women writers
Costa Rican expatriates in Chile
Costa Rican expatriates in Mexico